You Can't Make Old Friends is the twenty-seventh and final studio album of original music from American country music singer Kenny Rogers. Released on October 8, 2013 via Warner Bros. Nashville, it is Rogers's first album of original material since 2006's Water & Bridges. Its title track, a duet with Dolly Parton, peaked at number 57 on the Billboard Country Airplay chart in December 2013, becoming Rogers' first single released in four years. "You Can't Make Old Friends" was later included on Parton's 2014 album, Blue Smoke.

Track listing

Personnel 
 Kenny Rogers – lead vocals
 Charlie Judge – acoustic piano (1), synthesizers (1), strings (1, 10), keyboards (2, 3, 10)
 Clayton Ivey – electric piano (3), Hammond B3 organ (3, 5, 7, 8)
 Gordon Mote – acoustic piano (3, 10)
 John Barlow Jarvis – acoustic piano (4, 5, 7), Wurlitzer electric piano (5), electric piano (8)
 Warren Hartman – keyboards (5, 6, 8), string arrangements (6), backing vocals (6), percussion (11)
 Tony Harrell – keyboards (6)
 Jeff Taylor – accordion (6)
 Buckwheat Zydeco – accordion (7)
 John Hobbs – keyboards (9, 11)
 J. T. Corenflos – electric guitar (1, 2, 3, 10)
 Dann Huff – electric guitar (1, 2, 3, 10)
 Ilya Toshinsky – acoustic guitar (1, 2, 3, 9, 10, 11)
 Pat Buchanan – electric guitar (4, 5, 7, 8, 9, 11)
 Brent Mason – electric guitar (4, 5, 7, 8)
 John Willis – acoustic guitar (4, 5, 7), electric guitar (6)
 Bryan Sutton – acoustic guitar (6, 7), mandolin (6, 11), banjo (11)
 Paul Franklin – steel guitar (1, 10)
 Dan Dugmore – steel guitar (2, 3)
 Russ Pahl – steel guitar (4, 8, 9)
 Jimmie Lee Sloas – bass (1, 2, 3, 10)
 Michael Rhodes – bass (4, 5, 7, 8)
 Viktor Krauss – bass (6)
 Mike Brignardello – bass (9, 11)
 Greg Morrow – drums (1-5, 9, 10, 11)
 Steve Brewster – drums (6, 7, 8)
 Eric Darken – percussion 
 Larry Hall – strings (6), string arrangements (6)
 Jim Horn – tenor saxophone (7), baritone saxophone (7), horn arrangements (7)
 Dolly Parton – guest vocals (1)
 Russell Terrell – backing vocals (2, 3)
 Perry Coleman – backing vocals (4, 5, 7, 8, 9)
 Vicki Hampton – backing vocals (4, 5, 6, 9)
 Tania Hancheroff – backing vocals (4, 5, 6, 9)
 Cindy Walker Richardson – backing vocals (4, 5, 6, 9)
 Eric Paslay – backing vocals (5)
 Bob Bailey – backing vocals (6, 11)
 Jason Eskridge – backing vocals (6, 11)
 Steve Glassmeyer – backing vocals (6)
 Jordan Lehning – backing vocals (6)
 Michael Mishaw – backing vocals (6, 11)
 Gene Sisk – backing vocals (6)
 Will Robinson – Spanish language (6)
 Troy Johnson – backing vocals (7)
 Wes Hightower – backing vocals (11)

Production 
Tracks 1, 2, 3 & 10
 Producer – Dann Huff
 Engineer – Todd Tidwell
 Additional Engineer – Russell Terrell
 Assistant Engineers – Shawn Daugherty, Mike Lancaster and Seth Morton.
 Recorded at Starstruck Studios (Nashville, TN).
 Additional Engineering at RTBGV (Nashville, TN).
 Kenny Rogers' vocals recorded by Steve Marcantonio at Starstruck Studios, Blackbird Studio (Nashville, TN) and Doppler Studios (Atlanta, GA). 
 Mixed by Steve Marcantonio at Blackbird Studio.
 Digital Editing by Sean Neff

Tracks 4-9 & 11
 Producers – Warren Hartman and Kyle Lehning
 Basic Track Arrangements – Warren Hartman
 Engineer – Steve Marcantonio
 Assistant Engineers – Justin Francis and Mike Spezia
 Recorded at Ocean Way and Sound Stage (Nashville, TN).
 Additional overdubs engineered by Ryan Carr, Jordan Lehning and Kevin Sokolnicki
 Additional overdubs recorded and edited at The Compound (Nashville, TN).
 Accordion overdubs on Track 7 recorded by Tony Daigle at Dockside Studio (Maurice, LA).
 Kenny Rogers' vocals engineered by Jordan Lehning at Blackbird Studio, Sound Stage and The Compound.
 Mixed by Kyle Lehning at Blackbird Studio

Other Credits
 Mastered by Eric Boulanger and Doug Sax at The Mastering Lab (Ojai, CA).
 A&R Direction – Jason Henke, Cris Lacy and Rebekah Sterk.
 Production Coordination – Mike "Frog" Griffith
 Art Direction – Katherine Petillo
 Design – Sally Carnes Gulde
 Creative Director – Shane Tarleton
 Photography – Piper Ferguson and Thomas Petillo
 Booking – Greg Oswald at WME Entertainment.
 Management – Bob Burwell, Jason Henke and Ken Levitan at Vector Management.
 Business Management – Kevin Dalton and Dwight Wiles at Smith Wiles & Co.

Chart performance

Album

Singles

References

2013 albums
Albums produced by Dann Huff
Albums produced by Kyle Lehning
Kenny Rogers albums
Warner Records albums